The Railroad Track Maintenance Tax Credit, also known as the 45G Tax Credit, is a federal income tax credit for track maintenance conducted by short lines and regional railroads in the United States. The credit granted an amount equal to 50 percent of qualified track maintenance expenditures and other qualifying railroad infrastructure projects. It was inserted into the tax code by the American Jobs Creation Act of 2004, and was taken into effect on January 1, 2005 with an expiration date of December 31, 2009. Following the Tax Relief, Unemployment Insurance Reauthorization, and Job Creation Act of 2010, signed into law on December 17, 2010, the tax credit was retroactively extended for 2010 and the expiration date moved to January 1, 2012. United States fiscal cliff legislation retroactively reinstated the tax credit for 2012 when signed into law January 2, 2013. The tax credit is effective through December 31, 2022.

Background

In the United States, short line and regional railroads grew exponentially following railroad deregulation in 1980. By 2005 there were more than 500 railroads of this nature, serving small and mid-sized towns that otherwise would have lost rail service. These railroads were responsible for supporting more than 11,000 industrial sites, making them critically important to the local economies of the regions they serve. Maintenance costs for rail infrastructure is often expensive and difficult for low income railroads to cover, as a result some railroads partnered with the companies they served in order to fund maintenance. In order to assist the railroads with maintaining their infrastructure, the Railroad Track Maintenance Tax Credit was created. With more than $330 million in shortline infrastructure investment made annually, credits of $165 million would be placed back in the hands of the railroads and shippers through the tax credit. 

Highway and road  infrastructure is maintained by federal and state governments. Freight rail infrastructure is maintained by private sector investments. Short lines use approximately 184 million gallons of fuel to move 10 million carloads of freight annually. Trucks would require 540 million gallons to move the same freight. Short lines keep 30 million truckloads per year off the highway.

American Jobs Creation Act of 2004

The tax credit originated with the American Jobs Creation Act of 2004. The credit was capped at $3,500 per mile of track, with eligibility for Class II and Class III railroads, any shippers who transport property using a Class II or Class III railroad, and companies that perform maintenance on or provide material to qualified railroads. With the passing of the act in October 2004, the effective date for the credit was December 31, 2004, with a scheduled expiration date of January 1, 2008, a period of three years.

Extensions

As scheduled, the tax credits originally expired on January 1, 2008. However, under the Emergency Economic Stabilization Act of 2008, the tax credit was extended through December 31, 2009. Expiration occurred for the second time as scheduled, however, an extension of the Railroad Maintenance Tax Credit was included in the Tax Relief, Unemployment Insurance Reauthorization, and Job Creation Act of 2010. Under the new legislation, the credit was retroactively applied to the 2010 tax year and extended through January 1, 2012.

United States fiscal cliff legislation retroactively reinstated the tax credit for 2012 when signed into law January 2, 2013.  After being delayed, the tax credit was again retroactively applied, this time to the 2018 tax year and extended through December 31, 2022.

IRS Form 8900
Internal Revenue Service Form 8900 is used to claim the tax credit by the taxpayer at a maximum of $3500 per short line track mile per year or 50% of qualified railroad track maintenance paid or incurred during the year whichever is less. Form 8900 is used to assign tax credits between eligible taxpayers who have come to an agreement to transfer tax credits.  Eligible taxpayers for this credit are short line railroads, transporters who use the railroad property and any taxpayer who furnishes goods and services to a short line railroad.  Shareholders or partners of these eligible taxpayer may receive a passthru of these credits on form K-1.

References

Tax credits
2005 in rail transport
Taxation in the United States